The following television stations operate on virtual channel 8 in the United States:

 K02JG-D in Prospect, Oregon
 K02JJ-D in Williams, Oregon
 K03DP-D in Scobey, Montana
 K03DS-D in Ruth, Nevada
 K03FB-D in Snowflake, etc., Arizona
 K03IA-D in Sula, Montana
 K03IL-D in Bullhead City, Arizona
 K05AF-D in Mina/Luning, Nevada
 K05BE-D in Lehmi, etc., Idaho
 K05GM-D in Plains-Paradise, Montana
 K05ND-D in Long Valley Junction, Utah
 K06AA-D in Broadus, Montana
 K06DM-D in Panaca, Nevada
 K06FE-D in Miles City, Montana
 K06HN-D in Gunnison, Colorado
 K07FL-D in Thompson Falls, Montana
 K07NU-D in White Sulphur Spring, Montana
 K07PA-D in Manitou Springs, Colorado
 K07PB-D in Thayne, etc., Wyoming
 K08HU-D in Aleknagik, Alaska
 K08KD-D in Alakanuk, Alaska
 K08KO-D in Cooper Landing, Alaska
 K08LL-D in Dolores, Colorado
 K08LS-D in Elko, Nevada
 K08MB-D in Weber Canyon, Colorado
 K08NQ-D in Ryndon, Nevada
 K08OU-D in Seattle, Washington
 K08OZ-D in Trout Creek, etc., Montana
 K08PI-D in Salmon, Idaho
 K08QE-D in Fergus Falls, Minnesota
 K08QL-D in Logan, Utah
 K08QM-D in Wendover, Utah
 K09FJ-D in Pioche, Nevada
 K09FK-D in Ursine, Nevada
 K09FL-D in Caliente, Nevada
 K09OY-D in Colstrip, Montana
 K09SD-D in Lehmi, etc., Idaho
 K10AC-D in Ashland, Montana
 K10PR-D in Thomasville, Colorado
 K10PS-D in Pine Ridge, South Dakota
 K10QJ-D in Mink Creek, Idaho
 K10QZ-D in Rosebud, etc., Montana
 K11FF-D in Superior, Montana
 K11HO-D on Polson, Montana
 K11IL-D in Bitterroot Range, etc., Montana
 K12LO-D in Ferndale, Montana
 K12QO-D in Aspen, Colorado
 K13BE-D in Harlowton, Montana
 K13OC-D in Douglas, etc., Alaska
 K13PE-D in Shady Grove, Oregon
 K13PF-D in Pinehurst, Oregon
 K13PI-D in Ruch & Applegate, Oregon
 K13PO-D in Hysham, Montana
 K13RD-D in Collbran, Colorado
 K13RV-D in Leadore, Idaho
 K13ZS-D in Sargents, Colorado
 K14KK-D in Flagstaff, Arizona
 K14RV-D in Forsyth, Montana
 K15ED-D in Waunita Hot Springs, Colorado
 K15GL-D in Trinidad/Valdez, etc., Colorado
 K15IM-D in Brookings, etc., Oregon
 K15IZ-D in Edgemont, South Dakota
 K15KR-D in Poplar, Montana
 K15ME-D in Salmon, Idaho
 K16EX-D in Clovis, New Mexico
 K16FU-D in Mina/Luning, Nevada
 K16IL-D in Kanab, Utah
 K16IX-D in Preston, Idaho
 K16ML-D in Corvallis, Oregon
 K17HA-D in Astoria, Oregon
 K17JS-D in Philipsburg, Montana
 K17KC-D in Meeteetse, Wyoming
 K17MB-D in Circleville, Utah
 K17MQ-D in Thompson Falls, Montana
 K17NJ-D in Rockaway Beach, Oregon
 K17NT-D in Ely & McGill, Nevada
 K18IP-D in Overton, Nevada
 K19CX-D in Yuma, Arizona
 K19HS-D in Grants Pass, Oregon
 K19IS-D in Inyokern, California
 K19KN-D in Eads, etc., Colorado
 K19KU-D in Walla Walla, Washington
 K19LT-D in Prineville, etc., Oregon
 K20JW-D in Jacks Cabin, Colorado
 K20KL-D in Drummond, Montana
 K20KU-D in Montpelier, Idaho
 K20ML-D in Parks, etc., Arizona
 K20OC-D in El Dorado, Arkansas
 K21HQ-D in Glendo, Wyoming
 K21JC-D in Pocatello, Idaho
 K21JK-D in Montrose, Colorado
 K21KI-D in Hatch, Utah
 K21MA-D in Emigrant, Montana
 K22DR-D in Laughlin, Nevada
 K22GM-D in Battle Mountain, Nevada
 K22IK-D in Rexburg, etc., Idaho
 K22IM-D in Challis, Idaho
 K22IQ-D in Cave Junction, Oregon
 K22KS-D in Libby, Montana
 K22LR-D in Collbran, Colorado
 K22MG-D in Woods Bay, Montana
 K22MH-D in Logan, Utah
 K22MW-D in Panguitch, Utah
 K22MX-D in Henrieville, Utah
 K22NQ-D in Holbrook, Idaho
 K23JH-D in Leadore, Idaho
 K23NJ-D in Prescott, etc., Arizona
 K23NT-D in Mayfield, Utah
 K23NX-D in Gateway, Colorado
 K23OK-D in Walker Lake, Nevada
 K24BY-D in Pahrump, Nevada
 K24FL-D in Columbus, Montana
 K24GY-D in Ely, Nevada
 K24HU-D in Burley, etc., Idaho
 K24IB-D in Verdi/Mogul, Nevada
 K24KX-D in Cedarville, California
 K25KS-D in The Dalles, Oregon
 K25MR-D in Snowmass Village, Colorado
 K25PD-D in Parowan/Enoch/Paragonah, Utah
 K25PF-D in Delta, Oak City, etc, Utah
 K25PP-D in Eureka, Nevada
 K25PX-D in Lund & Preston, Nevada
 K25PY-D in Leadore, Idaho
 K26FV-D in La Grande, Oregon
 K26GG-D in Golconda, Nevada
 K26OS-D in Sapinero, Colorado
 K26OX-D in Colstrip, Montana
 K27JZ-D in Round Mountain, Nevada
 K27KP-D in Driggs, Idaho
 K27KW-D in Gold Hill, etc., Oregon
 K27NR-D in Topock, Arizona
 K28AD-D in Montrose, Colorado
 K28JY-D in Carbondale, Colorado
 K28MJ-D in Tillamook, Oregon
 K28NY-D in La Grande, Oregon
 K28PL-D in Roseau, Minnesota
 K28PX-D in Stead, Nevada
 K28QC-D in Imlay, Nevada
 K29AZ-D in Newport, Oregon
 K29FS-D in Wolf Point, Montana
 K29HG-D in Jackson, Wyoming
 K29HM-D in Lake George, Colorado
 K29JL-D in Las Animas, Colorado
 K29LG-D in Soda Springs, Idaho
 K29NG-D in Crested Butte, Colorado
 K30FS-D in Hawthorne, Nevada
 K30GM-D in Capitan/Ruidoso, New Mexico
 K30LB-D in Beowawe, Nevada
 K30OI-D in Camp Verde, Arizona
 K30PI-D in Garrison, Utah
 K30PR-D in Pahrump, Nevada
 K30PX-D in Winnemucca, Nevada
 K30PY-D in Parlin, Colorado
 K31GJ-D in Alamogordo, New Mexico
 K31GZ-D in Lake Havasu City, Arizona
 K31IX-D in Salida, Colorado
 K31LG-D in Emery, Utah
 K31NI-D in Lamar, Colorado
 K31NV-D in Globe-Miami, Arizona
 K31NW-D in Forsyth, Montana
 K31OH-D in Mesa, Colorado
 K31PY-D in Roundup, Montana
 K32CQ-D in Shurz, Nevada
 K32IK-D in San Luis Valley, Colorado
 K32KC-D in Montpelier, Idaho
 K32NB-D in Beaver etc., Utah
 K32NQ-D in Salmon, Idaho
 K32NT-D in Crested Butte, Colorado
 K32OL-D in Redstone, Colorado
 K33IM-D in Malad City, Idaho
 K33IW-D in Coaldale, Colorado
 K33MC-D in Forsyth, Montana
 K33NX-D in Carlsbad, New Mexico
 K33OD-D in Kingman, Arizona
 K34CB-D in Lehmi, etc., Idaho
 K34DJ-D in Phoenix, etc., Oregon
 K34KE-D in Hood River, Oregon
 K34KM-D in Basalt, Colorado
 K34MF-D in Orovada, Nevada
 K34NC-D in Fish Creek, etc., Idaho
 K34NL-D in Sargents, Colorado
 K34OB-D in Howard, Montana
 K35CH-D in Cortez/Mancos, etc., Colorado
 K35HU-D in Grays River, Washington
 K35JW-D in Bridger, etc., Montana
 K35JZ-D in Alton, Utah
 K35MU-D in Cottonwood, etc., Arizona
 K35OI-D in Starr Valley, Nevada
 K35OM-D in La Veta, Colorado
 K35OO-D in Del Norte, Colorado
 K35OQ-D in San Luis, Colorado
 K35OR-D in Aguilar, Colorado
 K36DP-D in Pendleton, Oregon
 K36FZ-D in Meadview, Arizona
 K36JD-D in Jackson, Wyoming
 K36JO-D in Cheyenne, Wyoming
 K36NP-D in Baker Valley, Oregon
 K36OJ-D in Rainier, Oregon
 K36OM-D in Tropic, Utah
 K36ON-D in Escalante, Utah
 K36OO-D in Boulder, Utah
 K36OP-D in Hanksville, Utah
 K36OQ-D in Caineville, Utah
 K36PN-D in Beowawe, Nevada
 K38IU-D in Susanville, etc., California
 K40LH-D in Orderville, Utah
 K48BK-D in Monticello/Blanding, Utah
 K50MY-D in Cody, Wyoming
 KAET in Phoenix, Arizona
 KAIT in Jonesboro, Arkansas
 KBTV-CD in Sacramento, California
 KCCI in Des Moines, Iowa
 KCSG-LD in Ogden, Utah
 KESD-TV in Brookings, South Dakota
 KFAZ-CA in Visalia, California
 KFLA-LD in Los Angeles, California
 KFMB-TV in San Diego, California
 KGNS-TV in Laredo, Texas
 KGW in Portland, Oregon
 KGWZ-LD in Portland, Oregon
 KIAT-LD in Jonesboro, Arkansas
 KIFI-TV in Idaho Falls, Idaho
 KILA-LD in Cherry Valley, California
 KJCT-LP in Grand Junction, Colorado
 KJUD in Juneau, Alaska
 KKDJ-LD in Santa Maria, California
 KLAO-LD in Corpus Christi, Texas
 KLAS-TV in Las Vegas, Nevada
 KLKN in Lincoln, Nebraska
 KLST in San Angelo, Texas
 KMTI-LD in Manti and Ephraim, Utah
 KNOE-TV in Monroe, Louisiana
 KOBR in Roswell, New Mexico
 KOLO-TV in Reno, Nevada
 KOMU-TV in Columbia, Missouri
 KPAX-TV in Missoula, Montana
 KPSW-LD in Boise, Idaho
 KPTS in Hutchinson, Kansas
 KQSL in Fort Bragg, California
 KRFT-LD in Springfield, Missouri
 KSBW in Salinas, California
 KSNK in McCook, Nebraska
 KSVC-LD in Marysvale, Utah
 KSYS in Medford, Oregon
 KTLD-CD in Bakersfield, California
 KTSC in Pueblo, Colorado
 KTTA-LD in Monroe, Utah
 KTUL in Tulsa, Oklahoma
 KUAM-TV in Hagåtña, Guam
 KUCB-LD in Dutch Harbor, Alaska
 KUHT in Houston, Texas
 KULR-TV in Billings, Montana
 KUMV-TV in Williston, North Dakota
 KVFR-LD in Redding, California
 KVPS-LD in Indio, California
 KWYP-DT in Laramie, Wyoming
 KXMP-LD in Harrison, Arkansas
 KZDF-LD in Santa Barbara, California
 KZSD-TV in Martin, South Dakota
 W02AU-D in St. Francis, Maine
 W08ED-D in Marathon, Florida
 W08EH-D in Ponce, Puerto Rico
 W08EI-D in Guaynabo, Puerto Rico
 W08EJ-D in Anasco, Puerto Rico
 W09DJ-D in Wilkes-Barre, etc., Pennsylvania
 W12DI-D in Key West, Florida
 W18EU-D in Miami, Florida
 W21CL-D in Marathon, Florida
 W21EF-D in Waupaca, Wisconsin
 W28EW-D in Toccoa, Georgia
 WAGM-TV in Presque Isle, Maine
 WAKA in Selma, Alabama
 WAUG-LD in Raleigh, North Carolina
 WBDL-LD in Elk Mound, Wisconsin
 WCHS-TV in Charleston, West Virginia
 WDAZ-TV in Devil's Lake, North Dakota
 WDHS in Iron Mountain, Michigan
 WDSE in Duluth, Minnesota
 WFAA in Dallas, Texas
 WFIG-LD in Charlotte Amalie, U.S. Virgin Islands
 WFLA-TV in Tampa, Florida
 WGAL in Lancaster, Pennsylvania
 WGEN-LD in Miami, Florida
 WGEN-TV in Key West, Florida
 WGHP in High Point, North Carolina
 WGSC-CD in Murrells Inlet, South Carolina
 WGTQ in Sault Ste. Marie, Michigan
 WGTV in Athens, Georgia
 WHCQ-LD in Cleveland, Mississippi
 WISH-TV in Indianapolis, Indiana
 WJW in Cleveland, Ohio
 WKBT-DT in La Crosse, Wisconsin
 WLIO in Lima, Ohio
 WMTW in Poland Spring, Maine
 WNCE-CD in Glens Falls, New York
 WNFT-LD in Gainesville, Florida
 WNPT in Nashville, Tennessee
 WOFT-LD in Ocala, Florida
 WOOD-TV in Grand Rapids, Michigan
 WPDR-LD in Tomah, Wisconsin
 WPSJ-CD in Hammonton, New Jersey
 WQAD-TV in Moline, Illinois
 WRIC-TV in Petersburg, Virginia
 WROC-TV in Rochester, New York
 WSIU-TV in Carbondale, Illinois
 WSVI in Christiansted, U.S. Virgin Islands
 WTNH in New Haven, Connecticut
 WVFW-LD in Miami, Florida
 WVLT-TV in Knoxville, Tennessee
 WVMY-LD in Parkersburg, West Virginia
 WVUE-DT in New Orleans, Louisiana
 WWCP-TV in Johnstown, Pennsylvania
 WXGA-TV in Waycross, Georgia
 WYCN-LD in Providence, Rhode Island
 WZCK-LD in Madison, Wisconsin

The following stations, which are no longer licensed, formerly operated on virtual channel 8:
 K05FR-D in Crowley Lake, California
 K06KO-D in Kanarraville, etc., Utah
 K08AX-D in Ardenvoir, Washington
 K08BA-D in Orondo, etc., Washington
 K08ID-D in Tuluksak, Alaska
 K08JZ-D in Waunita Hot Springs, Colorado
 K08NP-D in John Day, Oregon
 K34LC-D in Rifle, etc., Colorado
 K36AF-D in New Castle, Colorado
 K36HV-D in Wallowa, Oregon
 K38FO-D in Carbondale, Colorado
 K41GI-D in Imlay, Nevada
 K42EV-D in Glenwood Springs, Colorado
 K45AF-D in Parachute, etc., Colorado
 W11AY-D in St. John Plantation, Maine
 WFXI in Morehead City, North Carolina

References

08 virtual